I Watched It on the Radio is the second studio album by American country music artist Lionel Cartwright. Singles released from this album and their performance on the Hot Country Songs chart included, "I Watched It All (On My Radio)" (#8), "My Heart Is Set on You" (#7), and "Say It's Not True" (#31). The album itself peaked at number 21 on the charts.

Track listing
All songs written by Lionel Cartwright; except where noted.
 "I Watched It All (On My Radio)" (Cartwright, Don Schlitz) - 3:21
 "Old Coal Town" - 2:59
 "Playing It Safe" - 3:32
 "In The Long Run" - 3:45
 "Say It's Not True" - 4:13
 "I Refuse To Sing the Blues" - 2:55
 "My Heart Is Set on You" - 3:13
 "Let's Try Again" - 3:28
 "Hard Act to Follow" (Cartwright, Cindy Cartwright) - 3:42
 "True Believer" - 3:15

Release history

Chart performance

Personnel
As listed in liner notes.
 Eddie Bayers – drums
 Barry Beckett – piano, Fender Rhodes, B-3 organ
 Lionel Cartwright – mandolin, acoustic guitar, piano, synthesizer, lead vocals
 Paul Franklin – steel guitar
 Dale Jarvis – background vocals
 Mac McAnally – acoustic guitar, background vocals
 Leland Sklar – bass guitar
 Steuart Smith – electric guitar, synthesizer
 Harry Stinson – background vocals

References

1990 albums
Lionel Cartwright albums
MCA Records albums
Albums produced by Tony Brown (record producer)